Independência is a municipality of the western part of the state of Rio Grande do Sul, Brazil. The population is 6,109 (2020 est.) in an area of 357.44 km².

Bounding municipalities

Três de Maio
Alegria
Inhacorá
Catuípe
Giruá

References

External links
http://www.citybrazil.com.br/rs/independencia/ 

Municipalities in Rio Grande do Sul